Eugene J. Lenzi is a former American racing driver and currently owns a restaurant Chicago. Lenzi raced in the Atlantic Championship, Formula Super Vee among other series.

Racing career
Lenzi grew up with Bignotti-Cotter Racing team owner Dan Cotter as their neighbor. Lenzi first appeared on the national racing scene in the SCCA National Championship Runoffs in 1984 and a year later, 1985. In 1985 and 1986 Lenzi joined Prather Racing. Prather Racing was headed by Edward Sexton and was the Swift dealer for the SCCA Central division.

With Intercar Racing Lenzi graduated into the SCCA Formula Super Vee. The driver started the season in a Martini Mk.47. Lenzi scored his best finish in a Ralt in sixth place at Detroit. Later in the season Lenzi raced the unsuccessful Anson SA6 (designed by Gary Anderson.

Befriended engineer Peter Jacobs and Lenzi founded Baci Racing in 1987 to race in the SCCA Formula Super Vee. At the Night before the 500 Lenzi won his only race in the series, at Indianapolis Raceway Park. In 1988 Lenzi was successful in the series finishing second in the championship. For 1989 Lenzi graduated into the Atlantic Championship scoring his best finish at Watkins Glen International. Lenzi finished in third place, behind Jocko Cunningham and Colin Trueman.

Restaurant business
Up until 1994 Lenzi worked at Gene & Georgetti's, a steakhouse founded in Chicago in the 1940s. The restaurant was founded by Lenzi's grandfather, Gene Michelotti. The company sponsored Lenzi's racing career through most of the years. In 1992 Gene & Georgetti's was sold by Michelotti to Marion and Tony Durpetti. In 1994 Lenzi founded his own steakhouse, Erie Cafe, with his wife Toni Lenzi.

Great steakhouse lawsuit

Lenzi and Gene & Georgetti's came into a legal struggle in 1995. Opening Erie Cafe E.J. and Toni referred to their family ties to E.J.'s grandfather Michelotti. As they actively referred to Gene & Georgetti's, without the latter's consent, Gene & Georgetti's filed a lawsuit. G&G claimed that the opening invitation and other advertisement violated the Lanham Trademark Act.

The case came before United States District Court for the Northern District of Illinois judge Elaine E. Bucklo. Judge Bucklo ruled that the Lanham Trademark Act was in place to protect customers against, for example, confusing advertisements. As the plaintiff did not bring forward any evidence proving any confusion caused, the judge ruled in favor of Erie Cafe.

Motorsports results

SCCA National Championship Runoffs

American Open-Wheel racing results
(key) (Races in bold indicate pole position, races in italics indicate fastest race lap)

Formula Super Vee

Atlantic Championship - East Coast

American Racing Series

Atlantic Championship

References

Atlantic Championship drivers
Indy Lights drivers
Formula Ford drivers
SCCA National Championship Runoffs participants
Racing drivers from Illinois
SCCA Formula Super Vee drivers